The following NASCAR national series were held in 2003:

2003 NASCAR Winston Cup Series - The top racing series in NASCAR.
2003 NASCAR Busch Series - The second-highest racing series in NASCAR.
2003 NASCAR Craftsman Truck Series - The third-highest racing series in NASCAR.

 
NASCAR seasons